The Government of the Macau Special Administrative Region allows citizens of specific countries/territories to travel to Macau for tourism or business purposes for periods ranging from 14 to 180 days without having to obtain a visa. For other entry purposes, such as establishing residence on a long-term basis, a different policy applies.

The Serviço de Migração (Immigration Department), under the Public Security Police Force, is the government agency responsible for immigration matters, whilst the Public Security Police Force itself is responsible for enforcing immigration laws in Macau.

All visitors must hold a passport valid for 1 month.

Unrestricted stay
Under Macanese laws, holders of the following documents are residents of Macau and are allowed to return to Macau:
 Macau Resident Identity Card
 Macao Special Administrative Region passport
 Macao Special Administrative Region Travel Permit
 Visit Permit for Residents of Macao to HKSAR

Short stays in Macau

Visa exemptions
Holders of passports issued by following countries and Hong Kong permanent residents can enter Macau as a visitor without a visa (for a maximum period as stated below):

1 year (1)

6 months (1)

90 days (56)

30 days (24)

1 - also applicable to holders of Taiwan Compatriot Permits.

Holders of a travel document issued by Portugal to non-citizens who are unable to obtain national passports are also exempt from possessing a visa to enter Macau for a maximum of 30 days.

14 days (1)

Unlimited access

Not in force

Entry procedures for Chinese nationals not residing in Macau
Special regulations are in force for persons of Chinese nationality who are not residents of Macau.

Mainland China
Mainland Chinese visitors to Macau are required to hold a Two-way Permit. The duration of stay is the one indicated on the exit endorsement, but if the duration indicated is longer than 90 days, the person must report to PSPF for a "special authorization of stay" within the first 90 days of entry. For those who are travelling to a third country or region, they can alternatively use their Chinese passports, Chinese Travel Documents or Travel Permits to and from Taiwan for Mainland Residents for a maximum stay of 7 days.

Non-permanent residents of Hong Kong with residency in mainland China are required to travel with the Two-way Permit along with the valid entry endorsement when travelling directly between Hong Kong and Macau.

Hong Kong
Permanent residents of Hong Kong holding valid Hong Kong Permanent Identity Cards or Hong Kong Re-entry Permits are granted a stay of 1 year upon entry. However, holders of Hong Kong SAR passports are only granted a stay of 7 days provided they are travelling to a third country or region.

Non-permanent residents of Hong Kong who are of Chinese nationality and without mainland residency (i.e., those who traveled to Hong Kong with a One-way Permit for permanent settlement) are required to use their Hong Kong Document of Identity for Visa Purposes when entering Macau. They can stay for a maximum of 30 days.

Entry procedures for visa nationals

Those holding travel documents that are not listed above will be required to obtain a visa for entry to Macau, either prior to arrival or on arrival.

Visa on arrival is valid for 30 days and can be used multiple times during its validity without the need of obtaining a new one. The application fee is MOP 100 per individual, MOP 200 per family passport, and MOP 50 per child under age 12 and per member of a tourist group of more than 10 people. Alternatively, they can apply for an "Authorization to Enter and Stay" through a representative in Macau.

Nationals of the following countries must obtain a visa in advance through the Chinese diplomatic mission (unless they hold a Hong Kong identity card). They can apply for an "Authorization to Enter and Stay" through a representative only when there are no Chinese diplomatic missions in their country or region of residence.

Entry refusal
Under Macanese law, visitors will be denied entry if:
 they have been deported from Macau,
 they have been prohibited from entering, staying in or transiting through Macau in accordance with local or international law.

In addition, visitors may be denied entry if:
 they are frequently entering Macau without justification,
 they have criminal convictions resulting in incarceration,
 they have committed, or have the intention of committing, a crime,
 they have no proof to support that they are bona fide visitors who will leave Macau at the end of their visit (e.g., insufficient funds, not possessing onward tickets or not possessing genuine travel documents).

Extending short stays in Macau
Visitors who have entered with short stay status can extend their "Authorization to Stay", should their travel plans change, by no more than 90 days. This can be done by applying at the local Serviço de Migração office.

Transit
Nationals who would normally require visas may enter Macau without a visa for 48 hours if they arrive and depart from Macau International Airport.

Long stays

Special Authorization to Stay for Non-resident Students

Non-resident students in possession of a valid travel document have to go to the Foreigners Subdivision of the Serviço de Migração office located in Taipa, to apply for a "Special Authorization to Stay". The Special Authorization to Stay for Non-resident Students is usually valid until 31 December if the study program ends on a date beyond the year, or valid until the last day of the program if the study program ends within the same year. For those who are enrolled in a study program which ends on a date beyond the year, can renew their Special Authorization to Stay for Non-resident Students before the expiry (expiries usually 31 December), only if the Non-resident student continues to be enrolled in the study program at the same higher institute in Macau.

Residence

Those wanting to take up residence in Macau for purposes of investment can do so via the Macau Trade and Investment Office in Macau, and then visit the local Serviço de Migração office.

Those wanting to take up residence for other reasons, such as employment, are required to make their application at their local Serviço de Migração office. The procedure varies depending on nationality and residency status. Chinese and Portuguese nationals should make their application via the Comissariado de Residentes at the local Serviço de Migração office, whilst foreign nationals should apply via the Comissariado de Estrangeiros at the local Serviço de Migração office.

Visitor statistics
Most visitors arriving to Macao were holding travel documents issued by the following countries:

See also

 Visa policy of China
 Visa policy of Hong Kong
 Visa requirements for Chinese citizens of Macau

References

External links

 Immigration and residence service, Public Security Police Force
 Macau SAR Identification Department

China, Macau
Foreign relations of Macau
Tourism in Macau